
Year 423 BC was a year of the pre-Julian Roman calendar. At the time, it was known as the Year of the Consulship of Atratinus and Ambustus (or, less frequently, year 331 Ab urbe condita). The denomination 423 BC for this year has been used since the early medieval period, when the Anno Domini calendar era became the prevalent method in Europe for naming years.

Events 
 By place 
 Persian empire 
 Ochus, satrap of Hyrcania and son of Artaxerxes I and a Babylonian concubine, seizes the Persian throne from his half brother Secydianus (or Sogdianus), whom he has executed. The new king rules as Darius II.

 Greece 
 The Athenian general, Laches, successfully moves in the Athenian Assembly for an armistice with Sparta to check the progress of Sparta's most effective general, Brasidas. However, the "Truce of Laches" has little impact on Brasidas and collapses within a year.
 Brasidas ignores the proposed year-long truce and proceeds to take Scione and Mende in the hope of reaching Athens and freeing Spartan prisoners. Athens sends reinforcements under Nicias who retakes Mende.

 Rome 
 Gaius Sempronius Atratinus and Quintus Fabius Vibulanus are elected as consuls
 Sextus Tempanius, Aulus Sellius, Sextus Antistius, and Spurius Icilius are chosen by the commons as tribunes

 By topic 
 Drama 
 Aristophanes' play The Clouds is performed as is Sophocles' play Maidens of Trachi and The Putine (The Bottle), by Cratinus.

Births

Deaths 
 Sogdianus, King of Persia (assassinated)

References 
Frey, Wendy, and Diane Hart. History Alive! Palo Alto, CA: TCI, 2004. Print.